Larry Duane Harlow (born November 13, 1951) is a retired professional baseball player who played six seasons in the Major Leagues with the Baltimore Orioles and California Angels.

Harlow was born in Colorado Springs but moved to Aztec, New Mexico at five years old. Harlow attended Aztec High School where he played football and ran track while playing baseball in the summers. He attended Mesa Community College prior to signing with the Baltimore Orioles as an amateur free agent on August 24, 1970. He played parts of four seasons with the Orioles before being traded to the California Angels for Floyd Rayford and cash on June 3, 1979. The transaction was the result of Harlow's lack of playing time with the Orioles and the Angels' need for an outfielder to replace the injured Rick Miller. Most of Harlow's career highs came during the  season with Baltimore when he scored 67 runs, recorded 112 hits, and 14 stolen bases. Harlow played his final MLB game on October 3, 1981, finishing with a career .248 batting average.

Harlow made the only pitching appearance in his MLB playing career in a one-sided 24–10 loss to the Toronto Blue Jays at Exhibition Stadium on June 26, 1978. The first of two consecutive position players used as a relief pitcher, he entered the game with the Orioles losing 19–6 at the start of the fifth inning. After retiring the first two batters, he walked three of the next four, all of whom scored as a result of a Rico Carty two-run single and a John Mayberry three‐run homer. He was replaced by Elrod Hendricks after issuing a fourth walk.

The highlight of Harlow's career was in Game 3 of the 1979 American League Championship Series against his former team with his walk-off double to left field off Don Stanhouse scoring Brian Downing from second base in the ninth inning of a 4–3 win that prevented the Angels from being swept by the Orioles.

References

External links

Pura Pelota (Venezuelan Winter League)

1951 births
Living people
Aberdeen Pheasants players
American expatriate baseball players in Japan
Asheville Orioles players
Baltimore Orioles players
Baseball players from Colorado
California Angels players
Fort Myers Sun Sox players
Hagerstown Suns players
Key West Sun Caps players
Las Vegas Stars (baseball) players
Lodi Dodgers players
Major League Baseball outfielders
Mesa Thunderbirds baseball players
Navegantes del Magallanes players
American expatriate baseball players in Venezuela
Rochester Red Wings players
Sportspeople from Colorado Springs, Colorado
Yakult Swallows players
Mesa Thunderbirds football players
Baseball players from New Mexico
People from Aztec, New Mexico